HMS Medusa was a  of the British Royal Navy. She was one of four destroyers, of similar design to the British M-class ordered by Greece in June 1914, which the British purchased during construction owing to the outbreak of the First World War.

Medusa (originally named Lesvos) was launched by the Scottish shipbuilder John Brown in March 1915 and was completed in July that year. She entered service with the Harwich Force, but was abandoned after being badly damaged in a collision on 26 March 1916.

Design
The British ships were ordered from the Coventry Syndicate, a consortium of the shipbuilders John Brown,  Fairfield and Cammell Laird and the armament manufacturer Coventry Ordnance Works. The cruisers were to be built by Cammell Laird while two destroyers each would be built by John Brown and Fairfield.

The destroyers were of similar design to the contemporary M-class being built for the British Royal Navy, with the major difference being a modified machinery arrangement.

Three Yarrow water-tube boilers fed steam to Brown-Curtis impulse steam turbines, driving two propeller shafts. The ship's boilers were arranged with two boilers in one large compartment adjacent to the engine room and one in a smaller compartment forward, while the British M-class had the larger boiler compartment forward and the small boiler compartment adjacent to the engine room. Three funnels were fitted.

Armament consisted of three 4-inch (102 mm) Mark VII guns and two twin 21-inch (533 mm) torpedo tubes. The ship had a crew of 79.

Service
The four destroyers were ordered in June 1914, but the outbreak of the First World War resulted in them being purchased by Britain in August 1914. The second of the two ships built by John Brown, named Lesvos by the Greeks, was launched at John Brown's Clydebank shipyard on 27 March 1915 and was completed in May that year.

On commissioning, Medusa joined the Harwich Force. On 4–5 August 1915, Medusa took part in a sweep of four light cruisers and four destroyers of the Harwich Force against German torpedo-boats and trawlers that were believed to be patrolling off Terschelling. The force encountered no German surface forces, although a submarine, which quickly dived away, was sighted near the North Hinder light vessel. On 16 August 1915, 8 destroyers of the 10th Destroyer Flotilla, including Medusa, set out from Sheerness to escort the minelayer  which was tasked with laying a minefield on the Arum Bank. On the afternoon of 17 August, the force encountered a number of neutral and German fishing trawlers, which were suspected of signalling to Germany by radio. One trawler, the Roland BX.40, was boarded and scuttled by the destroyer , while Medusa stopped and searched a second German trawler, the Boreas, while the remaining ships of the force continued on with the mission. As the search found no radio, and believing that orders stated that trawlers could only be captured if radios were found, Medusa released Boreas. In fact, the commander of the operation, aboard Princess Margaret, had ordered that all German trawlers be sunk as well as any neutral trawlers found with radios.

On 24 March 1916, the Harwich Force set out on a raid by seaplanes launched by the seaplane carrier  against a German airship base believed to be at Hoyer on the coast of  Schleswig, with Medusa sailing as part of the escort. The air attack was launched early in the morning of 25 March. Two aircraft returned, reporting that the airship base was not at Hoyer as thought, but at Tondern further inland, and that they had been unable to attack it. Two divisions of destroyers, including Medusa, were ordered to search for the missing seaplanes. During the search, they encountered two German patrol boats,  Braunschweig and Otto Rudolf, which were quickly sunk by gunfire. During this engagement, the destroyer  collided with Medusa. Medusas engine room was holed and began to flood, meaning that Medusa lost all power and was unable to steam. Medusa was taken under tow by the flotilla leader . As the day went on, the weather grew steadily worse, with frequent snow storms and heavy seas, and at 7:40 pm the tow-line parted with the ships still only  from Horns Reef. Commodore Tyrwhitt, commander of the Harwich Force, ordered Medusas crew to abandon ship. The destroyer  took off Medusas crew, sustaining minor damage to her stem during the rescue operation, leaving Medusa apparently in sinking condition in heavy weather. Despite this, Medusa remained afloat, and was sighted by a Dutch trawler on 27 March. On 3 April, Medusa was discovered by another Dutch trawler which took the destroyer under tow and towed her to  Terschelling, but the destroyer ran aground on a sandbank at the entrance to Terschelling harbour on 5 April and was wrecked, with salvage attempts being abandoned on 22 April.

Pennant numbers

Notes

Citations

Bibliography

 

Medea-class destroyers
1915 ships
Ships built on the River Clyde